Pila may refer to:

Architecture
 Pila (architecture), a type of veranda in Sri Lankan farm houses

Places
Pila, Buenos Aires, a town in Buenos Aires Province, Argentina
Pila Partido, a country subdivision in Buenos Aires Province, Argentina
Pila, Croatia, a village in Croatia
Pila (Karlovy Vary District), a municipality in the Czech Republic
Pila, Aosta Valley, a ski resort in Italy
Pila, Piedmont, a municipality in Italy
Pila, a Barangay in San Pascual, Batangas, Philippines
Pila, Laguna, a municipality in the Philippines
Piła (disambiguation), various towns in Poland
Píla (disambiguation), several villages in Slovakia

Latin
Pila, a flat type of tile, used in Pilae stacks
Pila, the plural of pilum, a heavy javelin used in ancient Rome

Other uses
Pila (gastropod), a genus of African and Asian apple snails containing around 30 species